Chorr Police is an Indian animated television series that aired on Disney XD (India). As the title suggests, it is about a thief and a policeman. The show is available in Hindi, Tamil and Telugu.

Plot 
Anthony, a happy-go-lucky thief who lives in the slums of Mumbai, steals for the benefit of the underprivileged while constantly trying to outwit police officer Lovely Singh.

Characters

Main

Anthony 
Anthony is a lean and clever thief who lives in the slums of Mumbai and steals for the welfare of the other people in the slum, so he is known as the Robinhood Slumdog of Mumbai. Whenever he tries to steal something though, Lovely Singh finds out and tries to arrest him. This leads to some funny moments. Anthony's last name is unknown. He is voiced by Sumeet Pathak.

Inspector Lovely Singh 
Lovely Singh is a police inspector in Mumbai. In the opening, it is said that he came to Mumbai to be an actor in Bollywood, but he was unable to get any other job, so he became a police inspector. He chases after Anthony day after day to try to arrest him, but only succeeds sometimes, after which Anthony escapes. He is in love with Titli. He is voiced by Jasbir Jassi Singh Thandi.

Recurring

Titli 
She is a journalist who writes articles when Lovely Singh manages to catch Anthony. Lovely Singh is in love with her, but she doesn't seem to know.

Neel 
He is a seven-year-old boy who idolizes Lovely Singh. He also loves gadgets. He helps Lovely Singh catch Anthony and helps Anthony escape when Lovely Singh manages to catch him. He is just looking for fun.

Security guard 
He is always tricked by Anthony. Twice, he thought Anthony was a ghost. His name is not mentioned in the series.

Pandu Hawaldar 
He is a sergeant of Inspector Lovely Singh at his police station. He is a bit fat and can doze off quickly to sleep. His fortune is very bad. In the episode "Lovely Singh Demoted", he is only made Inspector for a short span of time.

Professor Pixels 
Professor Pixels appeared in the episode "Robot Police", depicted as a professor who has tried to improve the police force over the last 40 years. He invented the robot police, but ultimately it turned out to be a big flaw.

Chaman 
Chaman Chikna is a notorious thief in Mumbai, who is on the most wanted criminals list. He usually wears a pink shirt with white hearts. He often gets enraged with Anthony, which can lead to many comic scenes.

Broadcast 
It originally aired on Disney XD. Later it also aired on its sister channels Hungama TV and Disney Channel. The OTT platform Amazon Prime Video acquired the streaming rights of the series in 2016. Later it was also acquired by Sony YAY! in 2021.

See also
List of Indian animated television series

References

External links
 Chorr Police official website

Disney XD (Indian TV channel) original programming
Indian television sitcoms
Indian children's animated comedy television series
2009 Indian television series debuts
2012 Indian television series endings
Television shows set in Mumbai
Fictional portrayals of the Maharashtra Police
Green Gold Animation
Disney Channels Worldwide original programming
Animated television series without speech